The Grand Promenade is a high-rise residential development built in 2005 in Sai Wan Ho, Hong Kong. The complex consists of five towers, with towers 2, 3, and 5 being interconnected The towers are 213 - 219 metres tall and contain 2,020 apartments.

This property has been cited by the government and academics as having had a negative "wall effect" on surrounding neighbourhoods because of its bulky size on reclaimed land next to the harbour, which leads to poor air ventilation for nearby residents.

The awarding of the tender in 2001 to billionaire Lee Shau Kee's Henderson Land Development was met with much controversy over the calculation of land premium. The result of this controversial episode was the massive size of the towers and the aforementioned negative "wall effect".

History
The entire complex was developed by Henderson Land Development and its subsidiary, The Hongkong and Yaumati Ferry Co Ltd. Henderson Land won a tender for a site in Sai Wan Ho for Grand Promenade with a land premium of HK$2.43 billion in January 2001.

Land Calculation Controversy 
In July 2001, the developer successfully applied for and was granted permission to exclude the public transport terminus from the gross floor area in its building plan. A land tender controversy was caused when the Government maintained that former Director of Building Authority Leung Chin-man had reasonably exercised his discretionary powers to exempt the area of a public transport terminus in the gross floor area calculation of the development. The effect was to allow the addition of 10,700 square meters to the project, more than doubling the number of apartments from 1,008 to 2,020, costing the government HK$125 million in lost revenue. 

In November 2005, the Audit Commission accused Leung of not conferring with other government departments before exercising his discretionary power, thus handing the developer an additional HK$3.2 billion. Leung tabled a judicial review. The two sides reached a deal in May 2006, when the Commissioner dropped legal proceedings, and Leung abandoned his judicial review.

Buildings of the complex

Education
Grand Promenade is in Primary One Admission (POA) School Net 14. Within the school net are multiple aided schools (operated independently but funded with government money) and North Point Government Primary School.

See also
List of tallest buildings in Hong Kong

References

External links

Tower's Website 

Buildings and structures completed in 2005
Residential skyscrapers in Hong Kong
Henderson Land Development
Sai Wan Ho